Stade Pacy-Ménilles is a multi-use stadium in Ménilles, near Pacy-sur-Eure, France.  It is currently used mostly for football matches and is the home stadium of Pacy Vallée-d'Eure. The stadium is able to hold 2,000 people.

Pacy-Menilles
Sports venues in Eure